The 1894 All-Ireland Senior Football Championship was the eighth staging of Ireland's premier Gaelic football knock-out competition. Dublin were the champions in the first replayed final. In the Leinster semi final they ended Wexford's All Ireland title defence.

Results

Leinster

Munster

Tipperary objected - this was upheld.

Tipperary objected - this was upheld.

All-Ireland final

Note that, at the time, a goal was worth five points, so the first game was a draw: 6 points each. Cork led the replay 7 points to 5 when the Dublin team walked off the field after Cork supporters assaulted their players. As Cork were deemed responsible for the incident,  Dublin were awarded the title.

Championship statistics

Miscellaneous
 Dublin awarded the points to become All Ireland Champions.

References

All-Ireland Senior Football Championship